Maria Nápoles (born 7 November 1936) is a Portuguese former fencer. She competed in the women's individual foil event at the 1960 Summer Olympics.

References

External links
 

1936 births
Living people
Portuguese female foil fencers
Olympic fencers of Portugal
Fencers at the 1960 Summer Olympics
Sportspeople from Maputo